Erman Ilıcak (born 1967) is a Turkish businessman, and president of Rönesans Holding.

Biography

Completed secondary education and high school education in  TED Ankara College in 1985. Graduated from Middle East Technical University's Department of Civil Engineering in 1990. Completed Vienna University of Economics and Business and University of Minnesota's MBA program in 2002. Received a doctorate from International School of Management in Paris in 2011.

Business life

Began his working career while he was student, Erman Ilıcak founded Rönesans Holding in St. Petersburg in 1993. Ilıcak  still acts as the chairperson of the board of Rönesans Holding.

Headquartered in Ankara, today Rönesans Holding operates as the main contractor and investor in construction, real estate, health, energy and petrochemical fields, mainly in Turkey, Russia and the Netherlands, in a wide geographical area covering Central Asia, Europe, the Middle East and Africa, with more than 75 thousand employees in 28 countries. Today, Rönesans Holding builds heavy industry facilities, infrastructure projects, manufacturing industry facilities, chemical and pharmaceutical production facilities, food and beverage processing facilities, automotive and machinery plants, government buildings, health complexes and power plants, as well as shopping malls, offices, hotels, residences and mixed structures.

A member of the board of trustees of Rönesans Education Foundation REV, which was founded in 2009,  Ilıcak ranked 3rd in the "Generous Businesspeople" list of Capital magazine in 2019 with the donations he made. To date, more than thousands of non-repayable scholarships were granted to students through the REV Scholarship Program, which focuses on education and youth. TED Rönesans Koleji was founded by Rönesans Holding and Rönesans Education Foundation REV in cooperation with Turkish Education Association (TED) in 2014.

He acted as the president of TED Ankara Kolejliler Sports Club, in which he was a professional basketball player from 2014 to 2016 during his youth years.

Wealth
Ilıcak ranked first in Forbes Turkey’s “100 Wealthiest Turks” list in 2019 with his 3.8-billion-dollar wealth.  Ilıcak ranks no. 546 in the world’s wealthiest people list. He is also no. 5 in the list of 100 taxpayers who declared the greatest amount of annual income tax and corporate tax returns, according to the evaluation of Turkish Revenue Administration’s 2018 taxation period.

Honours 
 Order of the Rising Sun, 3rd Class, Gold Rays with Neck Ribbon

See also
 List of Turkish people by net worth

References

1967 births
Turkish businesspeople
Living people
Turkish billionaires
Middle East Technical University alumni
Vienna University of Economics and Business alumni
Recipients of the Order of the Rising Sun, 3rd class